Oxatriquinane (oxoniaperhydrotriquinacene) is an alkyl oxonium ion with formula (CH2CH2CH)3O+.  It has a cyclononane backbone, with a tricoordinated oxygen connected to carbon 1, 4, and 7, forming three fused pentagonal rings. In contrast to most trialkyloxonium ions, oxatriquinane hydrolyzes slowly.

History 
Oxatriquinane was first described in 2008. It five-step synthesis starts from 1,4,7-cyclononatriene.  
Ita C–O bond lengths are 1.54 Å. The C−O−C angles are also acute.

Reactions 
Oxonium ions normally are strong alkylating agents and are hydrolytically sensitive. Oxatriquinane does not react with boiling water or with alcohols, thiols, halide ions, or amines, although it does react with stronger nucleophiles such as hydroxide, cyanide, and azide. 
The ability of the oxygen to enter into a fourth covalent bond has been of some theoretical interest and was achieved using carborane acid. As illustrated by the structures of most metal oxides, oxygen compounds routinely have bonds to >3 elements in other classes of compounds.

Analogues
Related species include oxatriquinacene, the tri-unsaturated analogue, which is of interest as a possible precursor to oxaacepentalene, a neutral aromatic species. 1,4,7-tri-tert-butyloxatriquinane has also been synthesised; this compound contains significant amounts of intramolecular steric strain, resulting in further bond elongation to give C–O bond lengths of 1.622 Å, the longest recorded in any species.

References

Oxonium compounds
Oxygen heterocycles